Chong Khneas Catholic Church is a Roman Catholic church in Cambodia. It is a floating church, lying on the Tonle Sap lake.

See also 

 Cathedral of Phnom Penh
 St Joseph's Church, Phnom Penh

References 

Roman Catholic churches in Cambodia
Floating architecture